The Miguel Urrutia Art Museum (Spanish: Museo de Arte Miguel Urrutia (MAMU)) is an art museum in Bogotá, Colombia.

The MAMU is part of the Banrepcultural Network along with the Botero Museum, the Gold Museum, the Luis Ángel Arango Library, and the Old Mint of Colombia in Bogotá.

History 
In 2016, the museum changed its name from the Bank of the Republic Art Museum (Spanish: Museo de Arte del Banco de la República) to the Miguel Urrutia Art Museum as an homage to Colombian economist and academic Miguel Urrutia Montoya.

Collection 
The MAMU, alongside the Botero Museum, houses the Bank of the Republic Art Collection. Since 2013, the museum displays over 800 works of art in five curatorial departments.

First modern times (XVI–XVIII century)

Artists within this colonial-era include works by Antonio Acero de la Cruz, Angelino Medoro, Jan van Kessel the Elder, Jan Brueghel the Younger, Giovanni Francesco Maineri, Pieter Brueghel the Younger, modern artist Marina Abramović, and anonymous artists from the Quito School and the Cusco School amongst others.

Ruptures and Continuities (XIX century)
Colombian artists within this curatorial era include works by Ramón Torres Méndez, Andrés de Santa María, Francisco Antonio Cano Cardona, Ricardo Acevedo Bernal, and Pedro José Figueroa amongst others.

International artists within this curatorial era include works by Chuck Close, Henry Price, Vik Muniz, François Désiré Roulin, Paul Gauguin, Jean-Baptiste-Louis Gros, and Felipe Santiago Gutiérrez amongst others.

La Renovación Vanguardista (1910–1950) 
Colombian artists within this curatorial era include works by Josefina Albarracín, Rómulo Rozo, Ignacio Gómez Jaramillo, Francisco Antonio Cano Cardona, Sergio Trujillo Magnenat, Marco Tobón Mejía, Andrés de Santa Maria, Hena Rodríguez, Marco Tobón Mejía, Eladio Vélez, and Pedro Nel Gómez amongst others.

International artists within this curatorial era include works by Rafael Barradas, Pedro Figari, Joaquín Torres-García, David Alfaro Siqueiros, and Armando Reverón amongst others.

Classics, Experimentals, and Radicals (1950–1980)
Colombian artists within this curatorial era include Fernando Botero, Alejandro Obregón, Feliza Bursztyn, Miguel Ángel Rojas, Antonio Caro, Eduardo Ramírez Villamizar, Álvaro Barrios, Omar Rayo, Beatriz Gonzalez, Édgar Negret, Fanny Sanín, Enrique Grau, Miguel Ángel Rojas, Eduardo Ramírez Villamizar, Olga de Amaral, Lucy Tejada, Oscar Muñoz, and Ana Mercedes Hoyos amongst others.

International artists within this curatorial era include René Portocarrero, Francisco Toledo, Carlos Cruz-Diez, Rufino Tamayo, Jesús Rafael Soto, Rogelio Polesello, David Alfaro Siqueiros, Julio Le Parc, José Luis Cuevas, Fernando de Szyszlo, Vicente Rojo Almazán, Julio Alpuy, and Louise Nevelson amongst others.

Three decades of art in expansion (1980 to today)
Colombian artists within this curatorial era include works by Doris Salcedo, Oscar Muñoz, Danilo Dueñas, Feliza Bursztyn, Juan Pablo Echeverri, Miguel Ángel Rojas, Beatriz Gonzalez, Olga de Amaral, María Fernanda Cardoso, Antonio Caro, and Álvaro Barrios amongst others.

International artists within this curatorial era include works by Ana Mendieta, Marta Minujín, Los Carpinteros, Cildo Meireles, Marco Maggi, Carlos Garaicoa, Alfredo Jaar, León Ferrari, Vik Muniz, and Gabriel Orozco amongst others.

Selected objects

See also
 Colombian National Museum

References 

Museums in Bogotá
Art museums and galleries in Colombia